Brannon Run is a  long tributary to East Branch Oil Creek in Crawford County, Pennsylvania.

Course
Brannon Run rises on the McLaughlin Creek divide about 2 miles east of Centerville, Pennsylvania.  Brannon Run then flows northwest through the Erie Drift Plain to East Branch Oil Creek about 1.5 miles northeast of Centerville.

Watershed
Brannon Run drains  of area, receives about 45.4 in/year of precipitation, has a topographic wetness index of 436.55 and is about 60% forested.

References

Additional Maps

Rivers of Pennsylvania
Rivers of Crawford County, Pennsylvania